O'Neil Cruikshank (born 1 January 1968) is a Jamaican cricketer. He played in one first-class and two List A matches for the Jamaican cricket team from 1990 and 1992.

See also
 List of Jamaican representative cricketers

References

External links
 

1968 births
Living people
Jamaican cricketers
Jamaica cricketers